Desy may refer to:

People 
 Desy Lumini (1936–1993), Italian composer, singer, and actress
 Desy Ratnasari (born 1973), Indonesian actress
 Jean Désy (1893–1960), Canadian diplomat

Other uses 
 DESY, a national research center in Germany